Matamoras is an unincorporated community in Halifax Township, Dauphin County, Pennsylvania, United States, located in the Harrisburg-Carlisle Metropolitan Statistical Area.

Matamoras was named after the Mexican city of Matamoros, the scene of a battle in the Mexican–American War.

References

External links 
Matamoras Profile

Harrisburg–Carlisle metropolitan statistical area
Unincorporated communities in Dauphin County, Pennsylvania
Unincorporated communities in Pennsylvania